The Informant (also known as Border Informant) is a 2013 French crime thriller film written and directed by Julien Leclercq.

Plot
Marc Duval is a bar owner in Gibraltar. He is cornered by his creditors, so he agrees to become a paid informant for the French customs to report drug trafficking. He quickly finds himself drawn into events more and more dangerous and ends up being prosecuted as number two in a major drugs operation.

Cast 
 Gilles Lellouche  as Marc Duval
 Tahar Rahim  as  Redjani Belimane
 Riccardo Scamarcio as  Mario / Claudio Pasco Lanfredi
  Raphaëlle Agogué  as Clara Duval
 Mélanie Bernier as  Cécile Duval
 Philippe Nahon  as Glacose
 Aidan Devine  as Bobby Sims
 Raymond Cruz as Lance
 Peter Berg as Traveler 1
 Ralph Brown as French Prime Minister
 David Ortiz as GIGN 1
 Sean Avery as GIGN 2
 Michael Beach as David Patrick
 Alex Wolff as Dzhokhar Tsarnaev
 Rachel Brosnahan as Sarah
 Christopher O'Shea as News Reporter
 Vincent Curatola as Mike
 Elizabeth Rohm as US Embassy 1
 Kevin Chapman as Vincent
 Oliver Cotton as Barry
 Erica McDermott as News Reporter 1
 Vlasta Vrána as Nichols
 Alban Lenoir as Philippe
  Joe Cobden as Agent Carlyle
  Youssef Hajdi as The Messenger

Locations
The action takes place mostly in the area around La Línea, Gibraltar and Algeciras in Andalucía, Southern Spain, and in the Strait that separates the Spanish mainland from Morocco. Marc's bar is opposite the entrance to the marketplace in La Línea, the frontier town with Gibraltar. Other scenes feature Algeciras port and the Gibraltar border and airport. It is the mid-1980s, after the Spanish transition to democracy and before the sophistication of the drugs trade across the Strait became more complex.

Reception
Review aggregation website Rotten Tomatoes reported an approval rating of 25%, based on eight reviews, with an average score of 4.75/10.

References

External links 

2013 crime thriller films
2013 films
French crime thriller films
Films about drugs
Films based on non-fiction books
Films directed by Julien Leclercq
Films scored by Clinton Shorter
2010s French films
2010s French-language films